The Oxford Science Park (OSP) is a science and technology park located on the southern edge of the city of  Oxford, England. It was officially opened in 1991 and is owned by Magdalen College, Oxford. The park maintains strong links with the nearby University of Oxford and currently contains just over 60 companies.

Facilities
There are two amenity buildings on the Science Park, the Magdalen Centre and the Sadler Building.
Both contain:

Cafe/restaurant
Conference suite
Meeting rooms

There is a nursery on the Science Park operated by The Oxford Nursery. There is also an Oxford Science Park Netball Club.

Location
The science park is situated in Littlemore, which is about 5 km to the south of Oxford city centre, south of the Oxford Ring Road.

See also
Begbroke Science Park
Cambridge Science Park
List of science parks in the United Kingdom
Science Area, Oxford

References

External links
Oxford Science Park website
BK Marketing Solutions - Digital Agency website

1989 establishments in England
Science Park
Magdalen College, Oxford
Science Park
Oxford Science Park
Science parks in the United Kingdom
High-technology business districts in the United Kingdom
Science Park
Economy of Oxfordshire